Casteldelfino is a comune (municipality) in the Province of Cuneo in the Italian region Piedmont, located about  southwest of Turin and about  northwest of Cuneo.  
  
Casteldelfino borders the following municipalities: Bellino, Elva, Oncino, Pontechianale, and Sampeyre. It is located in the upper Varaita Valley.

References

Cities and towns in Piedmont